2015 Montedio Yamagata season.

J1 League

References

External links
 J.League official site

Montedio Yamagata
Montedio Yamagata seasons